The Passover Seder plate (ke'ara) is a special plate containing symbolic foods eaten or displayed at the Passover Seder. The purpose of the Passover Seder plate is to show all the foods that perpetuate and emphasize the ideas of the people of Israel, and are designed to express the uniqueness of the Seder. Another idea is to keep the foods close and ready for Seder night.

Symbolic foods
Each of the six items arranged on the plate has special significance to the retelling of the story of Passover—the exodus from Egypt—which is the focus of this ritual meal. A seventh symbolic item used during the meal—the three matzos—is not considered part of the seder plate proper.

The six traditional items on the Seder Plate are as follows:

Maror and Chazeret 
Maror and Chazeret – Bitter herbs symbolizing the bitterness and harshness of the slavery that the Hebrews endured in Egypt. In Ashkenazi tradition, fresh romaine lettuce or endives (both representing the bitterness of the Roman invasions) or horseradish may be eaten as Maror in the fulfilment of the mitzvah of eating bitter herbs during the Seder. Chazeret are additional bitter herbs, usually romaine lettuce, that are used in the korech sandwich.

Charoset
Charoset – A sweet, brown mixture representing the mortar and brick used by the Hebrew slaves to build the structures of Egypt. In Ashkenazi Jewish homes, Charoset is traditionally made from chopped nuts, grated apples, cinnamon, and sweet red wine.

Karpas
Karpas – A vegetable other than bitter herbs representing hope and renewal, which is dipped into salt water at the beginning of the Seder. Parsley or another green vegetable. Some substitute parsley to slice of green onion (representing the bitterness of slavery in Egypt) or potato (representing the bitterness of the ghetto in Germany and in other European countries), both commonly used. The dipping of a simple vegetable into salt water and the resulting dripping of water off of said vegetables visually represents tears and is a symbolic reminder of the pain felt by the Hebrew slaves in Egypt. Usually, in a Shabbat or holiday meal, the first thing to be eaten after the kiddush over wine is bread. At the Seder table, however, the first thing to be eaten after the kiddush is a vegetable. This leads immediately to the recital of the famous question, Ma Nishtana—"Why is this night different from all other nights?" It also symbolizes the springtime, because Jews celebrate Passover in the spring.

Zeroah
Zeroah – Also transliterated Z'roa, this is typically a roasted lamb shank bone. It is special as it is the only element of meat on the Seder Plate, symbolizing the Korban Pesach (Passover sacrifice), or Pascal Lamb. It symbolizes the sacrifice of a lamb whose blood was painted on the doorway of enslaved Israelites houses so that God would pass over that house during the tenth plague.

Beitzah
Beitzah – A roasted egg, symbolizing the korban chagigah (festival sacrifice) that was offered at the Temple in Jerusalem, is then roasted and eaten as part of the meal on Seder night. Although both the Pesach sacrifice and the chagigah were meat offerings, the chagigah is commemorated by an egg, a symbol of mourning (as eggs are the first thing served to mourners after a funeral), evoking the idea of mourning over the destruction of the Temple and the inability to offer the biblically mandated sacrifices for the Pesach holiday. The use of an egg in the seder is first attested in the 16th-century Shulchan Aruch commentary of Rabbi Moses Isserles, and it is not known when the custom began. It is not used during the formal part of the seder. Some people eat a regular hard-boiled egg dipped in salt water or vinegar as part of the first course of the meal, or as an appetizer. The egg also represents the circle of life: birth, reproduction, and death.

Many decorative and artistic Seder plates sold in Judaica stores have pre-formed spaces for inserting the various symbolic foods.

Three Matzot
The sixth symbolic item on the Seder table is a plate of three whole matzot, which are stacked and separated from each other by cloths or napkins. The middle matzah will be broken and half of it put aside for the afikoman. The top and another half of the middle matzot will be used for the hamotzi (blessing over bread), and the bottom matzah will be used for the korech (Hillel sandwich).

Salt water
A bowl of salt water, which is used for the first "dipping" of the Seder, is not traditionally part of the Seder Plate but is placed on the table beside it. However, it sometimes is used as one of the six items, omitting chazeret. The salt water represents the tears of the Israelites when they were enslaved.

Variants

Vinegar – German and Persian Jews traditionally include vinegar on the seder plate, closest to the leader next to the karpas. The karpas was dipped in the vinegar rather than in salt water during the seder.
Orange – Some Jews include an orange on the Seder plate. The orange represents the fruitfulness for all Jews when marginalized Jews, particularly women and gay people, are allowed to become active and contribute to the Jewish community. A common, though incorrect, rumor says that the tradition began when a man told Susannah Heschel that a woman has as much business on the bimah in a synagogue as an orange does on the Seder plate. In fact, the tradition began when Heschel spoke at Hillel at Oberlin College, where she saw an early feminist haggadah that included Susan Fielding's short story about a young Jewish lesbian told by her Hasidic  rebbe that "there is as much place for a lesbian in Judaism as there is for hametz at the seder table." Heschel felt, as did those women at Oberlin, that putting bread on the Seder plate would mean accepting the idea that lesbian and gay Jews are as incompatible with Judaism as chametz is with Passover. At her next Seder, she used an orange as a symbol of inclusion for lesbians, gays, and others who are marginalized by the Jewish community. Participants eat a segment of the orange, spitting out the seeds as a symbol of rejecting homophobia.
Olive – An olive to express solidarity with Palestinians has been added to some seder plates. In 2008, Jewish Voice for Peace further publicised this with a call to add an olive to symbolise olive trees that have been uprooted in Palestine. Adding an olive as a call for peace between Israel and Palestine is a well acknowledged addition for some Jews.

See also
Jewish ceremonial art
Haft-sin, a similar display for Nowruz, the Iranian new year, may have influenced the development of the Seder plate

References

External links
Chabad.org: The Seder Plate
 Rabbi Eliezer Melamed, The Seder Plate in Peninei Halakha

Jewish ceremonial art
Jewish ceremonial food and drink
Passover seder